The Blohm & Voss P 214 was a small manned interceptor project described as a  Bemannte Fla. Bombe (Fla. standing for Flugabwehr), meaning "Manned Air Defence Bomb".
It was studied late in 1944 but not developed past the project stage.

No design description or drawing of the airframe is known to exist, and contemporary knowledge of it comes only from a few pages of operational discussion and performance graphs. Even the type of propulsion is not known.

Misidentifications 

The P 214 has in the past been misidentified as the MGRP composite design proposed by Karl Stöckel at the DVL. An exhibit displayed at the Military Aviation Museum in Virginia Beach, Virginia is claimed to be a replica.

Other authors have stated that it was one of the series of outboard-tail "batwing" projects studied by B&V during 1944-45.

Specifications

See also

References

P 214
Abandoned military aircraft projects of Germany
World War II jet aircraft of Germany